Agnieszka Radwańska was the defending champion, but lost to Li Na in the quarterfinals.

World No. 1 Victoria Azarenka won the 2012 China Open tennis title, defeating Maria Sharapova in the Women's Singles final, 6–3, 6–1.

Seeds

The four Tokyo semifinalists received a bye into the second round. They are as follows:
  Angelique Kerber
  Nadia Petrova
  Agnieszka Radwańska
  Samantha Stosur

Draw

Finals

Top half

Section 1

Section 2

Bottom half

Section 3

Section 4

Qualifying

Seeds

Qualifiers

Lucky losers
  Olga Govortsova

Draw

First qualifier

Second qualifier

Third qualifier

Fourth qualifier

Fifth qualifier

Sixth qualifier

Seventh qualifier

Eighth qualifier

References

External links
 Main Draw
 Qualifying Draw

China Open - Singles
2012 China Open (tennis)